TVP Kultura is the first TV theme channel to be run by the Polish public broadcaster TVP. It was launched on 24 April 2005 and is dedicated to arts and culture. Every day of the week, the channel concentrates on other disciplines; e.g., cinema, music, etc. It is broadcast from the TVP headquarters in Warsaw and is available on cable networks and on digital platforms in Poland.

Distribution
Broadcasting via Astra 19.2°E started in 2005, but was ceased on 31 December 2014 due to economic reasons.

External links

TVP Kultura at LyngSat Address

Telewizja Polska
Television channels and stations established in 2005
Television channels in Poland